The 2006 Mexican Figure Skating Championships took place between 13 and 19 November 2005 in Cuautitlán Izcalli. Skaters competed in the disciplines of men's singles and ladies' singles on the senior level. The results were used to choose the Mexican teams to the 2006 World Championships and the 2006 Four Continents Championships.

Senior results

Men

Ladies

External links
 results

Mexican Figure Skating Championships, 2006
Mex
Figure Skating Championships, 2006
Fig
Mexican Figure Skating Championships